Gazeta Panorama is a newspaper published in Albania. It is among the best-selling newspapers in the country and the most visited website in Albanian territory.

Gazeta Panorama, published by Panorama Group, the largest newspaper in Albania, the latest news at any time, daily, independent.

Gazeta Panorama is a daily newspaper in Albanian, published in Tirana, Albania. It is currently the largest newspaper and consequently the best-selling in the country, also its online portal/website is the most visited media portal in the Albanian territory and beyond wherever Albanians live.

Content

Sections
The newspaper is organised in three sections, including the magazine.
 News: Includes International, National, Tirana, Politics, Business, Technology, Science, Health, Sports, Education.
 Opinion: Includes Editorials, Op-Eds.
 Features: Includes Arts, Movies, Theatre, and Sport.

Web presence
Gazeta Panorama has had a web presence since 2004. Accessing articles requires no registration.

References
http://www.panorama.com.al/ 
http://www.panorama.al/

Newspapers published in Albania
Albanian-language newspapers